The church invisible,  invisible church, mystical church or church mystical, is a Christian theological concept of an "invisible" Christian Church of the elect who are known only to God, in contrast to the "visible church"—that is, the institutional body on earth which preaches the gospel and administers the sacraments. Every member of the invisible church is "saved", while the visible church contains all individuals who are saved though also having some who are "unsaved".

Views on the relation with Visible church

Distinction between two churches
The first person in church history to introduce a view of an invisible and a visible church is Clement of Alexandria. Some have also argued that Jovinian and Vigilantius held an invisible church view.

The concept was advocated by St Augustine of Hippo as part of his refutation of the Donatist sect, though he, as other Church Fathers before him, saw the invisible Church and visible Church as one and the same thing, unlike the later Protestant reformers who did not identify the Catholic Church as the true church. He was strongly influenced by the Platonist belief that true reality is invisible and that, if the visible reflects the invisible, it does so only partially and imperfectly (see theory of forms). Others question whether Augustine really held to some form of an "invisible true Church" concept.

The concept was insisted upon during the Protestant reformation as a way of distinguishing between the "visible" Roman Catholic Church, which according to the Reformers was corrupt, and those within it who truly believe, as well as true believers within their own denominations.  John Calvin described the church invisible as "that which is actually in God's presence, into which no persons are received but those who are children of God by grace of adoption and true members of Christ by sanctification of the Holy Spirit... [The invisible church] includes not only the saints presently living on earth, but all the elect from the beginning of the world." He continues in contrasting this church with the church scattered throughout the world. "In this church there is a very large mixture of hypocrites, who have nothing of Christ but the name and outward appearance..." (Institutes 4.1.7) Richard Hooker distinguished "between the mystical Church and the visible Church", the former of which is "known only to God."

John Wycliffe, who was a precursor to the reformation, also believed in an invisible church made of the predestinated elect. Another precursor of the reformation, Johann Ruchrat von Wesel believed in a distinction between the visible and invisible church.

Pietism later took this a step further, with its formulation of ecclesiolae in ecclesia ("little churches within the church").

Non-distinction
Roman Catholic theology, reacting against the protestant concept of an invisible Church, emphasized the visible aspect of the Church founded by Christ, but in the twentieth century placed more stress on the interior life of the Church as a supernatural organism, identifying the Church, as in the encyclical Mystici corporis Christi of Pope Pius XII, with the Mystical Body of Christ. In Catholic doctrine, the one true Church is the visible society founded by Christ, namely, the Catholic Church under the global jurisdiction of the bishop of Rome.

This encyclical rejected two extreme views of the Church: 
 (1)  A rationalistic or purely sociological understanding of the Church, according to which it is merely a human organization with structures and activities, is  mistaken. The visible Church and its structures do exist but the Church is more, as it is guided by the Holy Spirit: Although the juridical principles, on which the Church rests and is established, derive from the divine constitution given to it by Christ and contribute to the attaining of its supernatural end, nevertheless that which lifts the Society of Christians far above the whole natural order is the Spirit of our Redeemer who penetrates and fills every part of the Church.
 (2)  An exclusively mystical understanding of the Church is mistaken as well, because a mystical "Christ in us" union would deify its members and mean that the acts of Christians are simultaneously the acts of Christ. The theological concept una mystica persona (one mystical person) refers not to an individual relation but to the unity of Christ with the Church and the unity of its members with him in her. This is where we can find direct contrast to Christian philosophy like the preachings of Rev.Jesse Lee Peterson, yet the personification is similar. There is another view, that contrasts these two school-of-thought, and that is from Albert Eduard Meier, as he includes Electric Theory in his teachings, similar to Creationism. 

Eastern Orthodox theologian Vladimir Lossky too characterizes as a "Nestorian ecclesiology" that which would "divide the Church into distinct beings: on the one hand a heavenly and invisible Church, alone true and absolute; on the other, the earthly Church (or rather 'the churches'), imperfect and relative".

See also
Catholicism
Christendom
Communion of Saints
Kallistos Ware's view on the nonduality between the church visible and church invisible
Four Marks of the Church
Invisible churches (slavery)
Priesthood of all believers
Radical Reformation
Tzadikim Nistarim

References

External links

 Origin and Development of the "Universal Invisible Church" Concept 
 Reformed/Roman Catholic International Dialogue, Towards a Common Understanding of the Church, 125-129
 Can the "Invisible Church" Be Traced Back to Specific Bible Passages?

Ecclesiology
Christian terminology